The following elections occurred in the year 1973.

Africa
 1973 Cameroonian parliamentary election
 1973 Equatorial Guinean legislative election
 1973 Ethiopian general election
 1973 Gabonese general election
 1973 Republic of the Congo constitutional referendum
 1973 Senegalese general election
 1973 Sierra Leonean general election
 1973 Zambian general election

Asia
 1973 Bahraini parliamentary election
 1973 Bangladeshi general election
 1973 Israeli legislative election
 1973 Turkish general election

Europe
 1973 Danish parliamentary election
 1973 Irish general election
 1973 Irish presidential election
 1973 Norwegian parliamentary election
 1973 Portuguese National Assembly election
 1973 Stockholm municipal election
 1973 Swedish general election
 1973 Turkish general election

France
 1973 French cantonal elections
 1973 French legislative election

United Kingdom
 1973 Berwick-upon-Tweed by-election
 1973 Chester-le-Street by-election
 1973 Dundee East by-election
 1973 Edinburgh North by-election
 1973 Glasgow Govan by-election
 1973 Hove by-election
 1973 Isle of Ely by-election
 1973 Lincoln by-election
 1973 United Kingdom local elections
 1973 Northern Ireland local elections
 1973 Manchester Exchange by-election
 1973 Northern Ireland Assembly election
 1973 Northern Ireland sovereignty referendum
 1973 Ripon by-election
 1973 West Bromwich by-election
 1973 Westhoughton by-election

United Kingdom local
 1973 United Kingdom local elections

English local
 1973 Greater London Council election
 1973 Manchester Council election
 1973 Trafford Council election
 1973 Wolverhampton Council election

North America

Canada
 1973 Manitoba general election
 1973 Quebec general election

United States

United States mayoral
 1973 Atlanta mayoral election
 1973 New Orleans mayoral election
 1973 Pittsburgh mayoral election
 ( 1973 Hoboken mayoral election )

Oceania

Australia
 1973 New South Wales state election
 1973 Parramatta by-election
 1973 Australian referendum
 1973 Semaphore state by-election
 1973 South Australian state election

South America
 March 1973 Argentine general election
 September 1973 Argentine presidential election
 1973 Chilean parliamentary election
 1973 Venezuelan presidential election

See also

 
1973
Elections